The following highways are numbered 334:

Australia
 
 Boort-Mitiamo Rd
 Echuca-Mitiamo Rd

Canada
 Manitoba Provincial Road 334
 Newfoundland and Labrador Route 334
 Nova Scotia Route 334
 Prince Edward Island Route 334
 Saskatchewan Highway 334

Costa Rica
 National Route 334

India
 National Highway 334 (India)

Japan
 Japan National Route 334

United States
  Connecticut Route 334
  Georgia State Route 334
  Indiana State Road 334 (former)
  Maryland Route 334
 New York:
  New York State Route 334
  County Route 334 (Erie County, New York)
 County Route 334 (Wayne County, New York)
  Ohio State Route 334
  Oregon Route 334
  Puerto Rico Highway 334
  Tennessee State Route 334
 Texas:
  Texas State Highway 334
  Texas State Highway Loop 334 (former)
  Virginia State Route 334
  Wyoming Highway 334